Astranthium, or Western-daisy, is a North American genus of flowering plants in the family Asteraceae. Astranthium is native to the United States and Mexico.

Species
The genus includes the following species:

 Astranthium beamanii DeJong – Nuevo León
 Astranthium ciliatum (Raf.) G.L.Nesom – United States (Southern Plains: Texas Oklahoma Arkansas Kansas Missouri)
 Astranthium integrifolium (Michx.) Nutt. – United States: (Cumberland Plateau, Ohio/Tennessee Valley:  Tennessee Kentucky Mississippi Alabama Georgia West Virginia)
 Astranthium laetificum DeJong	 - southern Mexico
 Astranthium mexicanum (A.Gray) Larsen – Oaxaca, D.F., Mexico State, Morelos, Hidalgo
 Astranthium orthopodum (B.L.Rob. & Fernald) Larsen – Chihuahua, Durango
 Astranthium purpurascens (B.L.Rob.) Larsen – Chiapas, San Luis Potosí
 Astranthium reichei Rzed. – central Mexico
 Astranthium robustum (Shinners) De Jong – United States (western Texas)
 Astranthium splendens DeJong – Nuevo León
 Astranthium xanthocomoides (Less.) Larsen – Hidalgo, Veracruz
 Astranthium xylopodum Larsen – Jalisco

References

Astereae
Asteraceae genera
Flora of North America